Robert Pitt Jenkins (26 January 1814 – 26 October 1859) was an Australian politician.

He was born in New South Wales to merchant Robert Jenkins and Jemima Pitt. He was a pastoralist who owned land at Bombala and on the Murrumbidgee River. On 10 November 1843 he married Louisa Adelaide Plunkett. He was a member of the New South Wales Legislative Council from 1856 until 1859, when he died at sea near Wales.

References

1814 births
1859 deaths
Members of the New South Wales Legislative Council
19th-century Australian politicians
People who died at sea